The Longest Night is a 1936 American mystery film directed by Errol Taggart and written by Robert Hardy Andrews. The film stars Robert Young, Florence Rice, Ted Healy, Julie Haydon, Catherine Doucet and Janet Beecher. The film was released on October 2, 1936, by Metro-Goldwyn-Mayer. Running a mere 51 minutes, it is believed to be the shortest feature ever produced by MGM, lending a certain irony to the title.

Elements of the plot were later reworked into the 1941 Marx Bros. comedy The Big Store.

Plot
A department store where she works is robbed by Eve Sutton and an accomplice, Carl Briggs. A wristwatch they stole is recognized by Eve's sister Joan, who reports her suspicions to Mrs. Briggs, who is Eve's boss at the store.

Joan bumps into Charley Phelps, the store owner's son, who develops a personal interest in her. As an investigation into the robbery begins, Carl Briggs is shot and killed, his mother's body is also found, and Eve and a co-worker, Mr. Grover, are taken hostage.

To bring help, Joan starts a fire that sets off the store's sprinkler system. Firemen and police race to the scene as Joan and a crew of cleaning ladies fend off the gang, while Charley fights and overcomes the scheme's mastermind and killer, Grover.

Cast 
 Robert Young as Charley Phelps
 Florence Rice as Joan Sutton
 Ted Healy as Police Sergeant Magee
 Julie Haydon as Eve Sutton
 Catherine Doucet as Mrs. Wilson G. Wilson
 Janet Beecher as Mrs. Briggs
 Leslie Fenton as Carl Briggs
 Sidney Toler as Captain Holt
 Paul Stanton as Mr. Grover
 Etienne Girardot as Kendrick Kinney
 Tommy Bupp as Albert Wilson
 Samuel S. Hinds as Hastings
 Minor Watson as Hardy
 Kitty McHugh as Midge Riley
 Olin Howland as Smythe
 Gertrude Sutton as Miss Ashforth
 John Hyams as Mr. Fergus

References

External links 
 
 
 
 

1936 films
American mystery films
1936 mystery films
Metro-Goldwyn-Mayer films
Films directed by Errol Taggart
American black-and-white films
Films scored by Edward Ward (composer)
1930s English-language films
1930s American films